Kelly  is an English-language given name, derived from the Irish surname Kelly. Kelly is historically a male-only name, but has been used as a female given name since the 1960s, though with a significant minority usage as a masculine name, especially within Celtic families.

Etymology

The surname Kelly has multiple origins. There is a Clan Kelly in Scotland, possibly derived from a toponym Kelloe. The Irish surname may be from either Ó Ceallaigh or Ó Cadhla, or yet again from a toponym. The surname was established in the United States by the early 19th century, and it began to be used as a masculine name in the later 19th century. Feminine usage first appeared in the 1940s and surpassed masculine usage around 1957 due to the popularity of the American actress Grace Kelly.

Popularity
According to the U.S. Social Security Administration, Kelly, as a name for a girl, was ranked #900 in 1950, then steadily gained popularity until 1977 (peaking at rank #10); Kelly, as a name for a boy, was consistently in the top 800 (but never the top 300) from 1881 to 1939, then steadily gained popularity until 1968 (peaking at rank #97).
The feminine name reached two significant peaks, rank #12 in 1968, then declining  to rank #23 in 1972, and again rising to rank #10 in 1977; both the feminine and the masculine name have been in steady decline since reaching their respective popularity peaks; the masculine name fell below rank #1000 in 2003; the feminine name lingers at rank #367 as of 2013.

In the United Kingdom, it made its way into the top 50 during the 1970s and by 1984 was the 15th most popular feminine first name. However, 10 years later it had declined to 53rd place and by 1999 had fallen out of the top 100.

People with the name

Feminine name
Kelly Ayotte (born 1968), American politician
Kelly J. Baker (born 1980), American writer and editor
Kelly Brook (born 1979), English model and actress
Kelly M. Burke, American politician
Kelly Chen (born 1972), Chinese singer and actress
 Kelly Cheung (born 1990), American actress and television host
Kelly Carlson (born 1976), American actress
Kelly Clark (born 1983), American snowboarder
Kelly Clarkson (born 1982), American singer
Kelly Craft, American diplomat
Kelly Evans (born 1985), American journalist
Kelly Fraga (born 1974), Brazilian volleyball player
Kelly Fraser (1993–2019), Canadian singer and songwriter
Kelly Fyffe-Marshall, Canadian filmmaker
Kelly Gale (born 1995), Swedish model
Kelly Haxton (born 1982), Canadian footballer
Kelly Higashi, American judge and lawyer
Kelly Holmes (born 1970), British athlete
Kelly Hoppen (born 1959), South African-British interior designer
Kelly Hu (born 1968), American actress
Kelly Johnson (1958–2007), English guitarist (Girlschool)
Kelly Keen (1978–1981), animal attack victim
Kelly Kelekidou (born 1979), Greek singer
Kelly Kelly (born 1987), Stage name of American professional wrestler, model, and former WWE Diva Barbara Blank
Kelly Key (born 1983), Brazilian singer
Kelly Kulick (born 1977), American bowler 	
Kelly LeBrock (born 1960), English-American actress and model
Kelly Llorenna (born 1975), English singer
Kelly Loeffler (born 1970), American businesswoman and politician
Kelly Lynch, (born 1959), American actress
Kelly Macdonald (born 1976), Scottish actress
Kelly Marie (born 1957), Scottish singer
Kelly McCormick (born 1960), American diver
Kelly McGillis (born 1957), American actress
Kelly McGonigal (born 1977), American psychologist
Kelly Merrick (born 1975), American politician
Kelly Mitchell, American politician
Kelly Morrison (born 1969), American politician and physician
Kelly Murphy (born 1977), American illustrator
Kelly Murphy (born 1989), American volleyball player
Kelly Overton, American actress 
Kelly Osbourne (born 1984), English actress and designer
Kelly Pace, multiple people
Kelly Poon (born 1983), Chinese singer
Kelly Preston (1962–2020), American actress
Kelly Price (born 1973), American singer
Kelly M. Miller, American academic
Kelly Ripa (born 1970), American actress and talk show host
Kelly Rondestvedt (born 1975), American investment banker and German princess
Kelly Rosen (born 1995), Estonian footballer
Kelly Rowland (born 1981), American singer (Destiny's Child)
Kelly Sheridan (born 1977), Canadian voice actress
Kelly Sildaru (born 2002), Estonian freestyle skier
Kelly Smith (born 1978), English footballer
Kelly Somers (born 1986), English sports reporter and presenter 
Kelly Sotherton (born 1976), British heptathlete
Kelly Stables (born 1978), American actress
Kelly Stefanyshyn (born 1982), Canadian swimmer
Kelly Stephens-Tysland (born 1983), American ice hockey player
Kelly Ten Hagen, American glycobiologist 
Kelly Thornton (born 1997), Irish actress
Kelly Thornton (born 1965), Canadian theatre director and dramaturge
Kelly Timilty (1962–2012), American politician
Kelly Wilson (disambiguation), Multiple females
Kelly Yu (born 1989), Canadian-Chinese singer

Masculine name
Kelly Alexander (born 1948), American politician
Kelly Armstrong (born 1972), American politician
Kelly Asbury (1960–2020), American animated film director and screenwriter
Kelly Bailey, composer and sound designer at Valve for the Half-Life video game series
Kelly Bennett (born 1971), Zimbabwean cricketer
Kelly Brown (born 1982), Scottish rugby player 
Kelly Bryant (born 1996), American football player
Kelly Blatz (born 1987), American actor and singer
Kelly Clark (lawyer) (1957–2013), American lawyer and politician
Kelly Chase (born 1967), Canadian ice hockey player and broadcaster
Kelly Coleman (1938–2019), American basketball player
Kelly C. Crabb (1946–2019), American lawyer
Kelly DeVries (born 1956), American historian
Kelly Flynn (1954–2021), American politician
Kelly Allen Frank, American fugitive
Kelly Gage (1925–2017), American lawyer and politician
Kelly Girtz, American politician
Kelly Graves (born 1963), American basketball coach
Kelly Gruber (born 1963), American baseball player
Kelly Holcomb (born 1973), American football player 
Kelly Hrudey (born 1961), Canadian ice hockey player and broadcaster
Kelly Johnson (1910–1990), American aeronautical engineer
Kelly Johnson (born 1982), American baseball player
Kelly D. Johnston (born 1956), American government official
Kelly Jones (born 1964), American tennis player
Kelly Jones (born 1974), Welsh musician
Kelly Keagy (born 1952) vocalist and drummer for American band Night Ranger
Kelly Kirchbaum (born 1957), American football player
Kelly Makin (fl. 2000s), Canadian television and movie director
Kelly Mantle (born 1976), American actor, singer/songwriter, comedian, musician, drag queen and reality television personality
Kelly McCarty (born 1975), American–Russian basketball player
Kelly Monteith (1942–2023), American comedian
Kelly Olynyk (born 1991), Canadian basketball player
Kelly Oubre (born 1995), American basketball player 
Kelly Paris (1957–2019), American baseball  player
Kelly Pavlik (born 1982), American boxer
Kelly Perdew (born 1967), American businessman, winner of The Apprentice 2
Kelly Perine (born 1969), American actor
Kelly Joe Phelps (1959–2022), American musician and songwriter
Kelly Reno (born 1966), American actor
Kelly Slater (born 1972), American surfer
Kelly Stinnett (born 1970), American baseball player
Kelly Tang (born 1961), Singaporean composer
Kelly Tripucka (born 1959), American basketball player
Kelly Wolf (born 1961), American politician
Kelly Williams (born 1982), American-Filipino basketball player

Fictional characters 
Kelly, a character in the 2020 American science fiction comedy movie Bill & Ted Face the Music
Kelly, a character in the  American sitcom Gung Ho
Kelly Ashoona, character in Degrassi: The Next Generation
Kelly, a female antagonist on the Teletoon Canadian animated sitcom Stoked
Kelly, "Valley girl" drag persona created by Liam Kyle Sullivan first for the video "Shoes"
Kelly, signature of The Onion's editorial cartoonist Ward Sutton
Kelly, a male poker friend of Bernie on The Bernie Mac Show
Kelly, a character from The Ridonculous Race
Kelly Bailey, played by Lauren Socha on the TV series Misfits
Dr. Kelly Brackett, played by Robert Fuller on the TV series Emergency!
Kelly Bundy, played by Christina Applegate on the TV series Married... with Children
Kelly Collins, DCOM in Cadet Kelly
Kelly Cramer, on the soap opera One Life to Live
Kelly Crenshaw, a pivotal character and the owner of the hardware store in the animated series Handy Manny
Kelly Gaines, played by Jackie Swanson on the U.S. TV series Cheers
Kelly Garrett (Charlie's Angels), played by Jaclyn Smith on the U.S. TV series Charlie's Angels
Kelly Generic, protagonists’ older sister on Bobby's World
Kelly Kapoor, played by Mindy Kaling on the U.S. version of The Office
Kelly Leak, baseball-playing thug in the 1976 film The Bad News Bears
Kelly Kapowski, played by Tiffani-Amber Thiessen on the U.S. TV series Saved by the Bell
Kelly Prescott, "mean girl" in Meg Cabot's The Mediator
Kelly Erin Hannon, played by Ellie Kemper on the U.S. version of The Office
Kelly Taylor, played by Jennie Garth on the U.S. TV series Beverly Hills, 90210
Kelly Taylor, played by Brooke Kinsella on the British soap opera EastEnders
Kelly Wainwright, played by Tanya Chisholm on the Nickelodeon TV series Big Time Rush
Kelly Roberts, Barbie's younger sister
Kelly Severide, played by Taylor Kinney on NBC's Chicago Fire
Kelly Sutekh, a minor character in the Lorien Legacies series, is Adamus Sutekh's sister.
Kelly Burkhardt, played by Mary Elizabeth Mastrantonio on NBC's Grimm (TV series)
Kelly the Crane, a male character in Thomas and Friends
Kelly-087, a female character in the Halo video game franchise
Kelly, a popular mean girl in the 2019 film K - 12 by Melanie Martinez. She is portrayed by Maggie Budzyna
Kelly, a character from the video game series Pop'n Music
Kelly, a character in The Sunny Side Up Show and The Chica Show; Sprout productions
Private Kelly, the main character in Kelly's Heroes

See also
Kelly-Anne, given name

References

English feminine given names
English masculine given names
English-language unisex given names
Irish-language unisex given names
Irish unisex given names
Scottish unisex given names
English unisex given names